The National Pledge of Ghana is recited immediately after the national anthem "God Bless Our Homeland Ghana" and is as follows:

"God Bless Our Homeland Ghana"

"God Bless Our Homeland Ghana" is the national anthem of Ghana, after which the National Pledge of Ghana is recited.

References

External links 
 The National Pledge
 Ghana's Flag, National Pledge, Anthem, and Coat of Arms
 The National Pledge of Ghana

National symbols of Ghana